Slieve Muck is one of the Mourne Mountains in County Down, Northern Ireland. The River Bann has its source on the northern slope.

Slieve Muck has three summits which are composed of Silurian shale covering the underlying granite. The shale forms an escarpment near the eastern side of the summits. The western slope is grassy and has a number of small streams flowing into the Deer's Meadow below. The eastern slope below the escarpment is made up of stony scree with lighter coloured areas appearing to spell out POV when seen from a distance, local people have used their imagination to complete the word Poverty, which has led to the mountain also being referred to as Poverty Mountain.

References

Mountains and hills of County Down
Marilyns of Northern Ireland
Hewitts of Northern Ireland
Mountains under 1000 metres